Gaiety or Gayety may refer to:
 Gaiety (mood), the state of being happy
 Gaiety Theatre (disambiguation)
 USS Gayety (AM-239, former name of the ship BRP Magat Salamat (PS-20)

See also
Gaiety Girls